Ngân Hàng Công Thương or Vietinbank VC is a Vietnamese women's volleyball club. The club was founded in 2003.

Honours

Domestic competitions

Vietnam League
  Champion (1): 2016
  Runner-up (4): 2012, 2013, 2015, 2019
  3rd place (6): 2006, 2007, 2011, 2014, 2017, 2018

Hùng Vương Cup
  Champion (4): 2006, 2012, 2016, 2017
  Runner-up (3): 2005, 2013, 2019
  3rd place (4): 2007, 2011, 2015, 2018

Vietnam U-23 Volleyball Championship
  Champion (2): 2020, 2022

VTV9 - Bình Điền International Cup
  Champion (2): 2006, 2016
  Runner-up (1): 2007
  3rd place (3): 2008, 2013, 2014

Liên Việt Post Bank Cup
  3rd place (3): 2011, 2012, 2017

International competitions

Asian Club Championship
  2017 — 7th place

Current squad
 Head coach:  Phạm Thị Kim Huệ
 Assistant coaches:
  Hà Thu Dậu
  Nguyễn Duy Quang

Notes:
 OP Opposite Spiker
 OH Outside Hitter
 MB Middle Blocker
 S Setter
 L Libero

Main team

Notable players 
  Vũ Thị Liễu
  Nguyễn Kim Nguyên
  Nguyễn Thanh Thúy
  Hà Thu Dậu
  Trần Thị Loan
  Nguyễn Thị Thu Hòa
  Hà Thị Hoa
  Đinh Thị Huyền
  Trần Thị Loan
  Đinh Thị Thúy
  Bùi Vũ Thanh Tuyền
  Phạm Thị Kim Huệ
  Võ Thị Vân Anh
  Nguyễn Thị Xuân
  Trần Tú Linh
  Đoàn Thị Xuân
  Vi Thị Như Quỳnh
  Lưu Thị Huệ

Former head coaches 
  Lê Văn Dũng
  Nguyễn Tuấn Kiệt (2019–2020)

External links

Vietnamese volleyball clubs
Volleyball in Vietnam
Sports clubs in Vietnam
Volleyball clubs established in 2003